Patrick Street is a street in central Limerick, Ireland. The street forms part of the main central thoroughfare of the city which incorporates Patrick Street, Rutland Street and O'Connell Street. The street is named after Patrick "Patt" Arthur (1717–1799), a member of the prominent Arthur family at the time. The streets of Francis Street, Ellen Street and Arthur's Quay are also named after the Arthur family.

The street was renovated in the early 1990s during the construction of Arthur's Quay Shopping Centre which forms the west side of the street. The shopping centre is mainly inward facing, which does not add much to footfall on the street. The east side of the street was part of the planned Opera Centre development. As a result, much of this section of the street lay derelict with no business activity for some time.

The Victorian-era soprano, Catherine Hayes, was born at 4 Patrick Street in 1818.

References

Streets in Limerick (city)